Fotheringay is the self-titled album by the group formed by Sandy Denny after she left Fairport Convention in 1969, and was the group's only contemporaneous release. It was recorded in 1970 with former Eclection member and Denny's future husband Trevor Lucas, with Gerry Conway, Jerry Donahue, and Pat Donaldson.  The album includes five Sandy Denny compositions (one of which was co-written with Lucas), one song by Lucas, as well as one traditional song and two cover versions: Bob Dylan's "Too Much of Nothing" and Gordon Lightfoot's "The Way I Feel".

Track listing

Personnel
Fotheringay
Sandy Denny – guitar, piano, vocals
Trevor Lucas – guitar, vocals
Jerry Donahue – lead guitar, vocals
Pat Donaldson – bass, vocals
Gerry Conway – drums
Linda Thompson – vocals
Todd Lloyd – vocals

Production
Producer: Joe Boyd
Recording engineer: Jerry Boys, Todd Lloyd
Art direction: cover illustrations by Marion Appleton
Photography: gatefold image by Tony Evans
Liner notes: n/a

References

External links
http://www.thebeesknees.com/category/fotheringay/ Fotheringay at Fledg'ling Records (reissued 28 July 2004)

1970 debut albums
Island Records albums
Albums produced by Joe Boyd
Fotheringay albums
Fledg'ling Records albums